In arithmetic and algebra, the cube of a number  is its third power, that is, the result of multiplying three instances of  together.

The cube is also the number multiplied by its square:
.

The cube function is the function  (often denoted ) that maps a number to its cube. It is an odd function, as
.

The volume of a geometric cube is the cube of its side length, giving rise to the name. It determines the side of the cube of a given volume. It is also  raised to the one-third power.

The graph of the cube function is known as the cubic parabola. Because the cube function is an odd function, this curve has a center of symmetry at the origin, but no axis of symmetry.

In integers

A cube number, or a perfect cube, or sometimes just a cube, is a number which is the cube of an integer.
The non-negative perfect cubes up to 603 are :

Geometrically speaking, a positive integer  is a perfect cube if and only if one can arrange  solid unit cubes into a larger, solid cube. For example, 27 small cubes can be arranged into one larger one with the appearance of a Rubik's Cube, since .

The difference between the cubes of consecutive integers can be expressed as follows:

.

or

.

There is no minimum perfect cube, since the cube of a negative integer is negative. For example, .

Base ten

Unlike perfect squares, perfect cubes do not have a small number of possibilities for the last two digits. Except for cubes divisible by 5, where only 25, 75 and 00 can be the last two digits, any pair of digits with the last digit odd can occur as the last digits of a perfect cube. Some cube numbers are also square numbers; for example, 64 is a square number  and a cube number . This happens if and only if the number is a perfect sixth power (in this case 2).

The last digits of each 3rd power are:

It is, however, easy to show that most numbers are not perfect cubes because all perfect cubes must have digital root 1, 8 or 9. That is their values modulo 9 may be only 0, 1, and 8. Moreover, the digital root of any number's cube can be determined by the remainder the number gives when divided by 3:
 If the number x is divisible by 3, its cube has digital root 9; that is, 
 
 If it has a remainder of 1 when divided by 3, its cube has digital root 1; that is, 
 
 If it has a remainder of 2 when divided by 3, its cube has digital root 8; that is,

Waring's problem for cubes

Every positive integer can be written as the sum of nine (or fewer) positive cubes. This upper limit of nine cubes cannot be reduced because, for example, 23 cannot be written as the sum of fewer than nine positive cubes:

23 = 23 + 23 + 13 + 13 + 13 + 13 + 13 + 13 + 13.

Sums of three cubes

It is conjectured that every integer (positive or negative) not congruent to  modulo  can be written as a sum of three (positive or negative) cubes with infinitely many ways. For example, . Integers congruent to  modulo  are excluded because they cannot be written as the sum of three cubes.

The smallest such integer for which such a sum is not known is 114. In September 2019, the  previous smallest such integer with no known 3-cube sum, 42, was found to satisfy this equation:

Fermat's Last Theorem for cubes

The equation  has no non-trivial (i.e. ) solutions in integers. In fact, it has none in Eisenstein integers.

Both of these statements are also true for the equation .

Sum of first n cubes

The sum of the first  cubes is the th triangle number squared:

Proofs.
 gives a particularly simple derivation, by expanding each cube in the sum into a set of consecutive odd numbers. He begins by giving the identity

That identity is related to triangular numbers  in the following way:

Applying this property, along with another well-known identity:

we obtain the following derivation:

In the more recent mathematical literature,  uses the rectangle-counting interpretation of these numbers to form a geometric proof of the identity (see also ); he observes that it may also be proved easily (but uninformatively) by induction, and states that  provides "an interesting old Arabic proof".  provides a purely visual proof,  provide two additional proofs, and  gives seven geometric proofs.

For example, the sum of the first 5 cubes is the square of the 5th triangular number,

A similar result can be given for the sum of the first  odd cubes,

but ,  must satisfy the negative Pell equation .

and so on.  Also, every even perfect number, except the lowest, is the sum of the first  odd cubes (p = 3, 5, 7, ...):

Sum of cubes of numbers in arithmetic progression

There are examples of cubes of numbers in arithmetic progression whose sum is a cube:

with the first one sometimes identified as the mysterious Plato's number.  The formula  for finding the sum of  
cubes of numbers in arithmetic progression with common difference  and initial cube ,

is given by

A parametric solution to

Cubes as sums of successive odd integers

In the sequence of odd integers 1, 3, 5, 7, 9, 11, 13, 15, 17, 19, ..., the first one is a cube; the sum of the next two is the next cube; the sum of the next three is the next cube; and so forth.

In rational numbers

Every positive rational number is the sum of three positive rational cubes, and there are rationals that are not the sum of two rational cubes.

In real numbers, other fields, and rings

In real numbers, the cube function preserves the order: larger numbers have larger cubes. In other words, cubes (strictly) monotonically increase. Also, its codomain is the entire real line: the function  is a surjection (takes all possible values). All aforementioned properties pertain also to any higher odd power ( ...) of real numbers. Equalities and inequalities are also true in any ordered ring.

Volumes of similar Euclidean solids are related as cubes of their linear sizes.

In complex numbers, the cube of a purely imaginary number is also purely imaginary. For example, .

The derivative of  equals .

Also in  only three elements 0, ±1 are perfect cubes, of seven total. −1, 0, and 1 are perfect cubes anywhere and the only elements of a field equal to the own cubes: .

History

Determination of the cubes of large numbers was very common in many ancient civilizations. Mesopotamian mathematicians created cuneiform tablets with tables for calculating cubes and cube roots by the Old Babylonian period (20th to 16th centuries BC). Cubic equations were known to the ancient Greek mathematician Diophantus. Hero of Alexandria devised a method for calculating cube roots in the 1st century CE. Methods for solving cubic equations and extracting cube roots appear in The Nine Chapters on the Mathematical Art, a Chinese mathematical text compiled around the 2nd century BCE and commented on by Liu Hui in the 3rd century CE.

See also

 Cabtaxi number
 Cubic equation
 Doubling the cube
 Eighth power
 Euler's sum of powers conjecture
 Fifth power
 Fourth power
 Kepler's laws of planetary motion#Third law
 Monkey saddle
 Perfect power
 Seventh power
 Sixth power
 Square
 Taxicab number

References

Sources

 
 
 
 
 
 
 

Elementary arithmetic
Figurate numbers
Integer sequences
Integers
Number theory
Unary operations